Mon Yazawin (also spelled Mwan Rajawan) is a chronicle that covers most of the Martaban–Pegu period. It is a 17th- or 18th-century Burmese translation of a Mon-language chronicle, commissioned by an unnamed early 16th-century crown prince. It is one of the two extant chronicles with the Burmese name "Mon Yazawin", with the other being a 19th-century translated chronicle by Shwe Naw.

Brief
The subject chronicle of this article mainly covers the Martaban–Hanthawaddy period down to the reign of King Binnya Ran II (r. 1492–1526), and devotes its longest section on King Dhammazedi (r. 1471–1492). Its early sections contain an origins story about the patron saint of the Lower Myanmar Mon named Gavampati.

According to the only extant palm-leaf manuscript of the chronicle, now located in the National Library of Myanmar, it is a Burmese translation of a Mon manuscript, made by or for an unnamed crown prince, the eldest son of the current king. The manuscript does not state who the crown prince was, who the king was, when the original text was written, who the translator was, or when it was translated. Michael Aung-Thwin's analysis of the Burmese translation finds that the original Mon text was probably written in or around Binnya Ran II's death in 1526; that the translation, based on its use of Burmese, was probably made after the 17th or 18th century; and that the chronicle's narrative of King Dhmmazedi suggests its connections to the chronicle Nidana Arambhakatha.

It is one of the two extant chronicles with the Burmese name "Mon Yazawin", with the other so-named chronicle being a 19th-century translation by Shwe Naw. Furthermore, the 18th-century chronicle Maha Yazawin lists a "Mon Yazawin" as one of its sources; but there is no evidence to link that Mon Yazawin to any of the extant Mon Yazawins.

Notes

References

Bibliography
 

Burmese chronicles
History of Myanmar
1520s books